Raibenshe, alternatively, Raibeshe, is a genre of Bengali folk martial dance performed by male only. This genre of dance was once very popular in West Bengal. Presently, it is performed mostly in Birbhum Bardhaman and Murshidabad districts.

Dance
Traditionally, this dance involves vigorous and manly movements of the body along with the acrobatics of a raibansh (a long bamboo stick), from which its name originated. During the performance, the performers enact the actions of drawing a bow, throwing a spear and waving a sword. The performers wear a brass anklet (nupur) on their right ankle. This dance is accompanied by dhols (drums) and Kanshis (cymbals). This dance was traditionally performed by Bagdi community, who worked as the bodyguards of the landlords in medieval Bengal.

See also 
 Gurusaday Dutt
 Bratachari Movement

References

Folk dances of West Bengal
Dances of India